María Fernanda de la Fuente Torre (born 6 March 1955) is a Mexican rower. She competed at the 1980 Summer Olympics and the 1984 Summer Olympics.

References

1955 births
Living people
Mexican female rowers
Olympic rowers of Mexico
Rowers at the 1980 Summer Olympics
Rowers at the 1984 Summer Olympics
Place of birth missing (living people)
Pan American Games medalists in rowing
Pan American Games silver medalists for Mexico
Rowers at the 1983 Pan American Games
Medalists at the 1983 Pan American Games
20th-century Mexican women
21st-century Mexican women